Comamonas sediminis is a Gram-negative bacterium from the genus Comamonas which has been isolated from lagoon sediments .

References

External links
Type strain of Comamonas sediminis at BacDive -  the Bacterial Diversity Metadatabase

Comamonadaceae
Bacteria described in 2016